Daniël de Koninck (1668–1730), was an 18th-century painter from the Northern Netherlands.

Biography
He was born in Amsterdam and is known for genre works and portraits in the manner of Rembrandt. From 1687 to 1690 he was apprenticed to his uncle, Jacob Koninck, at that time an artist at the court in Copenhagen, but in 1690, at the age of twenty-two, he moved to England where he specialized in portraits and tronies in the manner of Rembrandt.

He was the nephew of artist Philip de Koninck.

He died in England.

References

Daniel de Koninck on Artnet

1668 births
1730 deaths
18th-century Dutch painters
18th-century Dutch male artists
Dutch male painters
Painters from Amsterdam